The Madonna of the Red Cherubims is an oil on panel  painting by Italian Renaissance artist Giovanni Bellini, executed around 1485.
 
Stylistic elements such as the child on one of the Virgin's knees, and the mutual glance, suggest that the work was based on Bellini's Alzano Madonna in the same museum.

Description
The Virgin and Child are portrayed as a bust in the foreground, above a typical landscape with towers, castles and a fluvial inlet with a small boat.

The bright sky features a series of red cherubims which give their name to the picture. Also typical of Bellini is the parapet in the lower part, although this time he did not add the cartouche with the signature.

See also
Madonna of the Small Trees

Sources

Red Cherubim
1480s paintings